The Needham Street Bridge is a historic bridge at Needham Street over the Charles River connecting Needham and Newton, Massachusetts.  The bridge was built in 1875, when Needham Street was laid out, connecting Newton Centre, Newton Highlands, and Needham center.  It was designed and built by Hiram Blaisdell and William Wheeler, then in the early stages of a successful civil engineering career.  The bridge is one of the finest surviving stone arch bridges in the Boston area.  The bridge is distinctive among those that do survive as not having been widened.

Each span is a semi-elliptical arch spanning . It is one of Newton's oldest bridges.

The bridge was listed on the National Register of Historic Places in 1986.

See also
 List of bridges on the National Register of Historic Places in Massachusetts
 National Register of Historic Places listings in Newton, Massachusetts
 National Register of Historic Places listings in Norfolk County, Massachusetts

References

National Register of Historic Places in Newton, Massachusetts
National Register of Historic Places in Norfolk County, Massachusetts
Road bridges on the National Register of Historic Places in Massachusetts
Bridges completed in 1875
Buildings and structures in Newton, Massachusetts
Bridges in Middlesex County, Massachusetts
Bridges in Norfolk County, Massachusetts
Bridges over the Charles River
Stone arch bridges in the United States
1875 establishments in Massachusetts